Shades of Blue is the 18th album released by Ben E. King and was released in 1999.

Track listing
"Little Mama" – 3:32
"You're Drivin' Me Crazy" – 3:34
"Just for the Thrill" – 3:51
"They Can't Take That Away from Me" – 4:18
"Hallelujah I Love Her So" – 3:27
"Song for Jennie" – 3:45
"There'll Be Some Changes Made" – 3:45
"Stairway to the Stars" – 5:43
"You'd Be So Nice to Come Home to" – 2:19
"I Want a Little Girl" – 3:09
"Baby Won't You Please Come Home" – 4:28
"Cry" – 5:17
"Learnin' the Blues" – 4:30

Personnel
Ben E. King - executive producer, liner notes, vocals
Steve Alcott - bass guitar
Todd Anderson - alto saxophone, tenor Saxophone
Regis Andiorio - violin
Michael Blake - flute, tenor saxophone
Crispin Cioe - baritone saxophone
Rusty Cloud - piano
Jim Clouse - engineer, mastering, mixing, producer, tenor saxophone
Lou Gimenez - sound editing
Guido Gonzalez - trumpet
Alex Harding - baritone saxophone
Graham Hawthorne - drums
Aaron Heick - flute, alto saxophone
Richard Hendrickson - violin
Ned Holder - trombone
Daniel Hovey - guitar
Milt Jackson - vibraphone
Dale Kleps - flute, baritone saxophone
Dan Levine - trombone
Steve Little - drums
David Longworth - drums
Richard Maximoff - viola
David "Fathead" Newman - tenor saxophone
Tim Ouimette - arranger, conductor, flugelhorn, liner notes, producer, trumpet
Steve Remote - mixing engineer
John Walsh - trumpet

References

1993 albums
Ben E. King albums